Dennis Elwell is the name of:

Dennis Elwell (astrologer) (1930–2014), British astrologer
Dennis Elwell (politician) (born 1945), former mayor of Secaucus, New Jersey